Evert Bastet (born May 30, 1950 in Maracaibo, Venezuela) is a Canadian sailor. He won a silver medal in the Flying Dutchman Class at the 1984 Summer Olympics with Terry McLaughlin. He also finished fourth within the same category at the 1976 Summer Olympics. He lives in Hudson, Québec.

He was from Mississauga, Ontario, as of 1976.

References 

 Athlete Biography at Canadian Olympic Committee

1950 births
Olympic sailors of Canada
Canadian male sailors (sport)
Olympic silver medalists for Canada
Sailors at the 1972 Summer Olympics – Flying Dutchman
Sailors at the 1976 Summer Olympics – Flying Dutchman
Sailors at the 1984 Summer Olympics – Flying Dutchman
Living people
Olympic medalists in sailing
Medalists at the 1984 Summer Olympics
Sportspeople from Maracaibo
Flying Dutchman class world champions
World champions in sailing for Canada